The University of Sulaimani is a public university located in the city of Sulaymaniyah in Kurdistan Region - Iraq. It is one of the important scientific and cultural centers in Kurdistan region. It was founded by Professor Dr.Mohammed Salih Beg in 1968 (Dr Salih's project which he submitted to the government in 1958 and agreed in 1968), and re reopened in 1992. The main campus is in Sulaimani city, and satellite campuses are in the towns of Khanaqin, Kalar, Halabja and Chamchamal.

The university has a total yearly enrollment of more than 4000 undergraduate and postgraduate students. The university offers a variety of major programmes including medical, engineering, humanities, law, fine arts, physical education, political science, degree and in some specialties to postgraduate degrees such as High Diploma, MSc, MA and PhD. The university has a variety of other extracurricular activities, too.

History
The university was founded and secured by Professor Dr. Mohammed Mohammed Salih Beg in 1968 (Professor of Modern European History, History of England and Political Science). It was his primary aim in 1958 after gaining his PhD in 1957 from the  University of Chicago -United States of America.  The university was consisted of five faculties Medicine, Engineering, Science, Agriculture and faculty of Art, but during the years that followed, the number of faculties increased dramatically as a result of growing demands for higher education in the country.  In 1981, Ba'ath Regime transferred this academic establishment to the city of Erbil (Hawler) because of political activities against the regime, changing the name to University of Salahaddin.

In 1992 University of Sulaimani was re opened by tremendous efforts and enthusiasm of many Kurdish intellectuals and academics with the people of Sulaimani and was officially reopened on 14 November. This university is the mother of other universities in Kurdistan.  It is the oldest University in Kurdistan proper, therefore, it has its own significance in the history of Kurdistan.

Faculties 

Today University of Sulaimani includes (11) colleges, students obtain BSc and BA degrees in various fields of study. The colleges are:
 Faculty of Agricultural Sciences
 College of Commerce
 College of Veterinary Medicine
 Faculty of Engineering 
 Faculty of Administration 
 Faculty of Law and Politics
 Faculty of Language & Humanities 
 Faculty of Medical Sciences
 Faculty of Physical & Basic Education 
 Faculty of Science and Science Education
  Faculty of Humanities Education (Saidsadiq)

To provide the necessary teaching staff, the university also awards MA, MSc and PhD degrees in different fields of study. In the 2009–2010 academic year, 24,488 students attended classes as full-time students, there are (924) postgraduate students, there are ( 1357 ) teaching staff and ( 2329 ) administration staff too.

The new campus

Apart from the current campus which most of the colleges are located, the new campus of the university is located at the outskirts of Sulaymaniyah city and it is currently under construction, the entire project should be completed by 2012, the  new campus is of world standards with to date technologies and modern design, if completed by time it would be the one of the largest campuses in the region, the budget for its construction is nearly 450 million US dollars, despite of the new campus the colleges of Medicine, Dentistry, Pharmacy, and Nursing will remain in the old campus and there were rumors that these four colleges will be categorized as a whole different university under the name (Sulaimani Medical University) or any other name.

Institutes
Apart from this university, there are many technical, medical, and fine arts institutes in Sulaymaniyah.
In the city of Sulaymaniyah, the first kidney transplant operation from a living donor kidney was successfully performed by a transplant team in Shoresh General Hospital on the seventh of June 2008 Ref1&2.

Official Website
University of Sulaimani

References

 
Sulaymaniyah
Public universities
Educational institutions established in 1968
1968 establishments in Iraq
1992 establishments in Iraq